Kalateh-ye Seyyed Ali may refer to:
 Kalateh-ye Seyyed Ali, Gonabad, Razavi Khorasan Province
 Kalateh-ye Seyyed Ali, Mashhad, Razavi Khorasan Province
 Kalateh-ye Seyyed Ali, South Khorasan